Chuy is a teen magazine show of ABS-CBN Regional Network Group based in Cagayan de Oro. The shows airs every Sunday mornings on ABS-CBN Channel 2. On March 30, 2008, Chuy signed off as it gave way to MAG TV Na, Ato Ni! (now currently as MAG TV Na, Asenso Ta!), which is part of the same brand of regional talk or magazine shows premiering April 6.

See also
DXEC-TV
ABS-CBN Regional Network Group

ABS-CBN Regional shows
Mass media in Cagayan de Oro
2005 Philippine television series debuts
2008 Philippine television series endings